Fresco Wizard is a puzzle video game created by Lithuanian studio Puzzle Lab and published by game makers such as GameHouse and Reflexive Arcade.

The  principal goal of the game is to break the spell of an evil sorcerer who enchanted many objects having turned them into mosaics. When the mosaics are inlaid with gems, the spell cast over the objects is broken. The wizard uses his magic skills to disenchant the objects of the kingdom and save its people.

While travelling through the Enchanted Kingdom, the wizard must pass 18 scenes (each with its own exciting story) and fill in various mosaics, turning them into more than 150 objects of the magic land.

Fresco Wizard takes delight in making gem combinations and working small miracles with the help of his magic skills.

References

External links 
PuzzleLab, Fresco Wizard

2005 video games
Puzzle video games
Video games developed in Lithuania
Windows games
Windows-only games